Armod (Poverty) is the seventh album by the Swedish power metal band Falconer, released on 3 June 2011 through Metal Blade Records. Compared to the previous albums, Armod is more influenced by folk music and is sung entirely in Swedish (except for the bonus tracks which are Black Widow, O, Silent Solitude, Grimborg and by the Roses' Grave included on the Digipak version released on 7 June 2011).

Track listing

References 

2011 albums
Falconer (band) albums
Metal Blade Records albums